Sirius is a board game published by Bütehorn Spiele in 1976.

Gameplay
Sirius is an abstract strategy game.

Reviews
Games & Puzzles #79
Jeux & Stratégie #1 (as "Galax")

References

External links
 

Board games introduced in 1976